Orianne Lopez (born 20 May 1989) is a French Paralympic athlete who competes in international level events. She competed at the 2012 Summer Paralympics in the women's 100m T42 where she reached the final but did not medal.

References

External links 
 
 

1989 births
Living people
Sportspeople from Montpellier
Sportspeople from Nîmes
Paralympic athletes of France
French female sprinters
French female long jumpers
Athletes (track and field) at the 2012 Summer Paralympics